Chlorhoda rubricosta is a moth of the subfamily Arctiinae first described by Paul Dognin in 1889. It is found in Ecuador.

References

Arctiini